Holy Child Institute Girls' Higher Secondary School (Kolkata) is a Roman Catholic secondary school affiliated to the West Bengal Board of Secondary Education.  Established on 1 January 1956, the school is administered by the Society of "Sisters of Charity of Calcutta Province".

References

Catholic secondary schools in India
Girls' schools in West Bengal
High schools and secondary schools in West Bengal
Christian schools in West Bengal
1956 establishments in West Bengal
Educational institutions established in 1956

Adress-1, Abhedananda Rd, Manicktala, Azad Hind Bag, Kolkata, West Bengal 700006.